Coastal Prairie Conservancy was established in 1992 to conserve Katy Prairie, part of the Western Gulf coastal grasslands located in Texas, United States. Approximately 24,500 acres is under conservation easements or owned by CPC in western Harris and Waller Counties.

Preserves

Nelson Farms Preserve

Nelson Farms Preserve encompasses more than 1,700 acres, of which 200 acres still operates as a working rice farm to benefit wildlife dependent upon the agricultural wetlands present on the landscape. Cypress Creek flows through the preserve offering excellent habitat because of its perennial source of water and vegetative diversity. The unique combination of habitat types attracts significant numbers of waterfowl, waterbirds, migratory songbirds, raptor, beaver, white-tailed deer and other wildlife.

Warren Ranch

Warren Ranch is one of the largest remaining working cattle ranches on the prairie.

Williams Prairie Preserve

Williams Prairie is a 10 acre remnant prairie full of little bluestem, brownseed Paspalum, and Indiangrass. Egrets and other herons can be found residing year-round in the depressions as long as they continue to hold water during the warmer months.

Other protected areas on the Katy Prairie

West Side Airport Wetlands Mitigation Area
In 1986, the City of Houston purchased 1,432 acres for a potential future airport on Morton Road near the western edge of the Katy Prairie.  During the expansion of the Houston Bush Intercontinental Airport (IAH) the site was used as a wetlands mitigation area for migratory birds to the Katy Prairie.

John Paul Landing Park
John Paul Landing Park is a 865-acre public park operated by Harris County, located on Katy-Hockley Road and Sharp Road on the Katy Prairie.  The project has been in development for Precinct 3 since 2011 and includes 400-acre lake as well as an environmental education center.

Paul D. Rushing Park
Paul D. Rushing Park is a 232-acre public park operated by Harris County, located at 9114 Katy Hockley Road on the Katy Prairie. This park includes a lake and wildlife viewing area.

Katy Park
Katy Park system includes a series of two Harris County and one municipal parks located inside the City of Katy.  These parks encompass about 200-acres and over 1,000 trees and 35-acres of lakes.

Operations

Farming and ranching
The Coastal Prairie Conservancy supports the agricultural economy in three main ways: holding conservation easements on agricultural land, leasing land for rice growing operations, and managing the Warren Ranch. KPC owns and manages the Warren Ranch, in partnership with the Warren Family. The ranch’s pastureland is used to graze its own herd of cattle as well as those of other ranchers who lease from the ranch. CPC is rehabilitating the grasslands to sustain during drought and support numerous species and wildlife.

Hunting
CPC’s lands, including the Warren Ranch, provide high-quality dove, deer, and quail habitat and offer opportunities for hunting by the public. Texas Parks and Wildlife Department currently leases the CPC property as part of the Annual Public Hunting Permit Program.

Recreation
Community members enjoy hiking, birding, hunting, and many other activities on CPC’s lands. CPC’s unique native grasslands and migratory birds attract tourists such as birders and local visitors.

References

Further reading
 
 
 
 
 
 
 
 

Nature conservation organizations based in the United States
Nature reserves in Texas
Protected areas of Harris County, Texas
Protected areas of Fort Bend County, Texas
Protected areas of Waller County, Texas
Environmental organizations based in Texas
Grasslands of Texas
1992 establishments in Texas
1992 establishments in the United States
Organizations established in 1992
Environmental organizations established in 1992